Messier 95 is a galaxy in the constellation Leo.

M95 or M-95 may also refer to:

Military
 M-95 Degman, a tank
 Steyr-Mannlicher M1895, an Austro-Hungarian rifle
 M.95, a Dutch rifle
 Barrett M95, sniper rifle
 RK 95 TP, a Finnish assault rifle known commercially as M95

Other uses
 Haplogroup O-M95 (Y-DNA), a high-frequency subclass of haplogroup O-K18
 M-95 (Michigan highway), a state highway in Michigan
 M 95, an age group for Masters athletics (athletes aged 35+)
 Richard Arthur Field (FAA LID: M95)